Nephograptis is a genus of moths belonging to the family Tortricidae. It contains only one species, Nephograptis necropina, which is found in Nigeria.

See also
List of Tortricidae genera

References

 , 2005: World Catalogue of Insects vol. 5 Tortricidae.

External links

tortricidae.com

Endemic fauna of Nigeria
Tortricini
Monotypic moth genera
Taxa named by Józef Razowski
Moths of Africa
Tortricidae genera